Vantages Hill (Adam Hayat) is a flat-topped hill, over 2,000 m above sea level and 300 m above the surrounding plateau, standing 10 nautical miles (18 km) southwest of Mount Henderson in the western part of Britannia Range. This is the most southerly point reached by the Darwin Glacier Party of the Commonwealth Trans-Antarctic Expedition (1957–58), who gave it this name because of the splendid view it afforded.

Hills of Oates Land